Iran competed at the 1976 Summer Olympics in Montreal, Quebec, Canada. 86 competitors, 82 men and 4 women, took part in 50 events in 9 sports. Moslem Eskandar-Filabi was the flagbearer for Iran in the opening ceremony. This would be the last Olympics Iran would take part in until the 1988 Summer Olympics in Seoul, due to the Iranian Revolution two years later and the eventual outbreak of the Iran–Iraq War.

Competitors

Medal summary

Medal table

Medalists

Results by event

Aquatics

Water polo

Men

Athletics

Men

Boxing

Men

Cycling

Road

Men

Track

Men

Fencing

Men

Women

Football

Men

Shooting

Open

Weightlifting

Men

Wrestling

Men's freestyle

Men's Greco-Roman

References

External links
 Official Olympic Reports
 International Olympic Committee results database

Nations at the 1976 Summer Olympics
1976 Summer Olympics
Summer Olympics
Pahlavi Iran